USS Beagle may refer to the following ships of the United States Navy:

 
 

United States Navy ship names